Blacktown is a suburb of Sydney, New South Wales, Australia.

Blacktown may also refer to:

 City of Blacktown, Local Government Area
 Electoral district of Blacktown, New South Wales state electoral district
 Blacktown railway station, in Blacktown, New South Wales, Australia
 Blacktown (film), a 2005 Australian film
 Blacktown (Lapinot), a 1995 The Spiffy Adventures of McConey comics collection by Lewis Trondheim

See also
 
 Black (disambiguation)
 Black Township (disambiguation)
 Blackton (disambiguation)
 Black Town, in India